Jihoon Kim is a South Korean operatic bass and a Principal of The Royal Opera in the United Kingdom. He was a member of the Jette Parker Young Artists Programme 2011–13 and a Jette Parker Principal in the 2013/14 Season, appointed to his current position with The Royal Opera at the start of the 2014/15 Season. In the 2014/15 Season he sings Count Ceprano (Rigoletto), Tom (Un ballo in maschera) and Marquis d'Obigny (La traviata) for the Company.

Kim studied at the Seoul National University and the Giuseppe Verdi Conservatory in Milan. Before joining the Jette Parker Young Artists Programme, Kim's operatic roles included Simone and Betto (Gianni Schicchi), Doctor Grenvil (La traviata) and Colline (La bohème). He made his Royal Opera debut as Montano (Otello, Act IV) in the Plácido Domingo Celebration. His many roles since for The Royal Opera have included Alessio (La sonnambula), Ortel (Die Meistersinger von Nürnberg), Count Ceprano, Hector’s Ghost (Les Troyens), Montano (Otello), Don Prudenzio (Il viaggio a Reims, JPYAP 10th anniversary summer performance), Monterone (Rigoletto, Operalia Gala), Fourth Chevalier/Monk (Robert le diable), Colline, Zaretsky (Eugene Onegin), Sciarrone (Tosca), Second Man in Armour (Die Zauberflöte), Flemish Deputy (Don Carlo), Pietro (Simon Boccanegra), Servant (Capriccio), Robert (Les Vêpres siciliennes), Nightwatchman (Die Frau ohne Schatten), Wagner (Faust), Doctor Grenvil, Sergeant (Manon Lescaut), Lackey (Ariadne auf Naxos) and Balthazar (La Favorite Act I, JPYAP summer performance).

Kim has performed widely in concert and recitals throughout South Korea and Europe. He has sung in Verdi's Requiem on tour in France with the Learning and Participation department of the Royal Opera House, and organized and performed in a concert of Korean music in the Paul Hamlyn Hall. His other performances at the Royal Opera House include Colas (Bastien und Bastienne) and Ogre (El gato con botas) in Meet the Young Artists Weeks.

References

Living people
South Korean male singers
Operatic basses
South Korean basses
Year of birth missing (living people)
Seoul National University alumni
Milan Conservatory alumni